Neda was a princess of Duklja, wife of the Great Župan Stefan Vojislav.

She was the niece of the Bulgarian Tsar Samuel. She was the second wife of Stefan Vojislav, with whom she had five sons – Gojislav, Mihailo, Saganek, Radoslav, Predimir. After his death in 1043, she ruled the kingdom for some time, together with her sons.

Neda died in 1046.

References 

Princesses
Cometopuli dynasty